Gav Gol (also Romanized as Gāv Gol; also known as Gāf Gol and Gāvkol) is a village in Qaleh Juq Rural District, Anguran District, Mahneshan County, Zanjan Province, Iran. At the 2006 census, its population was 135, in 30 families.

References 

Populated places in Mahneshan County